is a Japanese snowboarder. She competed in the 2018 Winter Olympics.

References

1999 births
Living people
Snowboarders at the 2018 Winter Olympics
Snowboarders at the 2022 Winter Olympics
Japanese female snowboarders
Olympic snowboarders of Japan
Asian Games medalists in snowboarding
Snowboarders at the 2017 Asian Winter Games
Asian Games bronze medalists for Japan
Medalists at the 2017 Asian Winter Games
Universiade gold medalists for Japan
Universiade medalists in snowboarding
Competitors at the 2019 Winter Universiade
X Games athletes
21st-century Japanese women